The 1983–84 Scottish League Cup final was played on 25 March 1984, at Hampden Park in Glasgow and was the final of the 38th Scottish League Cup competition. The final was an Old Firm derby contested by Rangers and Celtic.

Rangers won the match 3–2 thanks to an Ally McCoist hat-trick. He scored a penalty in the first half, conceded a foul to give Celtic theirs in the last minute of normal time and then was himself fouled during extra time; although he had this second penalty saved, he scored the winning goal from the rebound.

Match details

References 

1983
League Cup Final
Celtic F.C. matches
Rangers F.C. matches
1980s in Glasgow
March 1984 sports events in the United Kingdom
Old Firm matches